A Set of Variations is a 1969 short story collection by Frank O'Connor. It was compiled shortly after the author's death by his widow, Harriet O'Donovan Sheehy, and includes the following stories:

A Set of Variations on a Borrowed Theme (alternate title: Variations on a Theme)
The American Wife
The Impossible Marriage
The Cheat
The Weeping Children
The Saint
A Minority
An Out-And-Out Free Gift
Anchors
Sue
Music When Soft Voices Die
A Life of Your Own
The Corkerys
A Story By Maupassant
A Great Man
The School For Wives
Androcles and the Army
Public Opinion
The Party
Achilles' Heel
Lost Fatherlands
The Wreath
The Teacher's Mass
The Martyr
Requiem
An Act of Charity
The Mass Island

A similar collection was published in the U.K. in 1969 as Collection Three. The stories included were slightly different, and Collection Three featured one story not included in A Set of Variations ("A Mother's Warning").

References

1969 short story collections
Short story collections by Frank O'Connor
Works by Frank O'Connor
Books published posthumously